The Ministry of Transportation and Communications governs transportation in Taiwan.

Land transport

Roads 

 Total length: 41,475 km (2009)
 National highway: 901 km
 Provincial highway: 4,680 km
 Highways: 20,947 km (including 872 km of freeways)
 Urban roads: 16,395, km

Rail 

Total: 1,580 km (2009) (all on the island of Taiwan)
 Taiwan Railways Administration: 1,097 km of  gauge
 Taiwan High Speed Rail:           354 km of  gauge
 Kaohsiung Mass Rapid Transit:    51.8 km of  gauge
 Taipei Metro:                   131.1 km of  gauge
 Taoyuan Metro:                  51.03 km of  gauge
 Taiwan Sugar Corporation: 240 km of  gauge
 Forestry Bureau:          86 km of  gauge

High-speed rail 

The Taiwan High Speed Rail (THSR) commenced operations on 5 January 2007, after some delays in 2006. The THSR connects Taipei City in the northeast of the island of Taiwan to Kaohsiung City in the southwest.  The journey time is about 90 minutes compared to 4 hours by conventional rail.  30 Shinkansen Class 700T sets are running on the 345 km HSL, with station stops at Taipei Main station, Panchiao, Taoyuan, Hsinchu, Taichung, Chiayi, Tainan and Tsuoying near Kaohsiung.  Four additional stations have been opened: Nankang in eastern Taipei, Miaoli, Changhua and Yunlin. In 2008 THSR increased the number of trains to 88 per day, each way.

The Shinkansen 700T is similar to the Japanese 700 Nozomi. It operates in 12 car sets (9 powered, 3 trailers) at a speed limit of 300 km/h over standard gauge  track. OCS power is 25 kV AC 60 Hz.

Conventional rail

Urban transit 

There are five urban transit systems in Taiwan: Taipei Metro, New Taipei Metro, Taichung Metro, Taoyuan Metro, and Kaohsiung Rapid Transit.

Taipei Metro opened in 1996 and runs on an extensive network of both Multiple Unit for the high-capacity system as well as VAL for the medium-capacity system throughout the metropolitan area of Taipei. The metro system operates 6 lines consisting of 131 stations.

Kaohsiung Rapid Transit opened in 2008 and runs a metro network throughout the metropolitan area of Kaohsiung. The Red and Orange lines opened on 9 March and 14 September, 2008 respectively. Future lines are planned in order to parts of Greater Kaohsiung as well as Pingtung County.

The Taoyuan Metro is a metro system with one operational line, one in construction, and one in planning. (Airport MRT, green, brown). The Airport MRT serves Taoyuan, Taipei and New Taipei after it opened in March 2017.

Taichung Metro officially began operation on April 25, 2021 with its Green Line opening. In addition to Taichung, the network will also serve the Changhua and Nantou counties. The metro will start off with 3 main lines (green, blue, and orange), with four other lines planned.

The Tainan Mass Rapid Transit System (台南捷運) was postponed by the Ministry of Transportation and Communications in January 2010 due to fear of insufficient riders and construction costs. The government has instead chosen to upgrade current rail systems and buses.

The Hsinchu Mass Rapid Transit System (新竹捷運) was postponed by the Ministry of Transportation and Communications in January 2010 due to doubts about whether the transit system would be beneficial in the short term.

Air transport

Airports 

During the global COVID-19 pandemic traffic at Taiwan’s large international airports fell sharply while traffic to smaller domestic airports increased as a result of a surge in domestic tourism.

Total: 40

Length of runways:
 Over 3,047 m: 6   (Taipei Taoyuan, Taichung, Kaohsiung, Tainan, Chiayi, Pingtung)
 2,438 to 3,047 m: 5   (Kinmen, Magong, Hualien, Taipei Songshan, Taitung)
 1,524 to 2,437 m: 2   (Hengchun, Nangan)
 914 to 1,523 m: 4  (Beigan, Lanyu, Lyudao, Wang-an)
 Under 914 m: 1  (Qimei)

Airlines 

Total: 7

 China Airlines
 Daily Air
 EVA Air
 Mandarin Airlines
 Tigerair Taiwan
 Uni Air
 Starlux Airlines

Heliports 
Total: 31 (2013)

 Sea transport 

 Ports Major ports: Kaohsiung, Keelung, Taichung, HualienOther ports: Anping, Su'ao, TaipeiInterior ports: Budai, MagongMerchant marine:'112 ships (1,000 GT or over) totaling 3,827,173 GT/ (2010)ships by type:''
 Bulk 35
 Cargo 20
 Chemical tanker 1
 Container 31
 Petroleum tanker 12
 Passenger/cargo 4
 Refrigerated cargo 7
 Roll on/roll off 2

Pipelines 

As of 2013, Taiwan maintains the following pipelines

Condensate 25 km
Gas 802 km
Oil 241 km

See also
 Plug-in electric vehicles in Taiwan

References